The Pennsylvania State Game Lands Number 287 are Pennsylvania State Game Lands in Armstrong County in Pennsylvania in the United States providing hunting, bird watching, and other activities.

Geography
SGL 287 consists of a five parcels located in Boggs, Madison and Pine Townships. Mahoning Creek and Whiskey Creek pass through the Game Lands, both part of the watershed of the Allegheny River, part of the Ohio River watershed. Nearby communities include populated places Cosmus, Deanville, Dee, Frenchs Corners, Hooks, Mahoning, Morrows Corner, Reesedale, Rimer, Templeton, Tidal, and Widnoon. The highway carrying Pennsylvania Route 28 and Pennsylvania Route 66 skirts to the east and south of SGL 287.

Statistics

Biology
Hunting and furtaking species include Black bear (Ursus americanus), Coyote (Canis latrans), deer (Odocoileus virginianus), Gray fox (Urocyon cinereoargenteus), Red fox (Vulpes vulpes), ruffed grouse (Bonasa umbellus), ring-necked pheasant (Phasianus colchicus), squirrel (Sciurus carolinensis), and turkey (Meleagris gallopavo).

See also
 Pennsylvania State Game Lands
 Pennsylvania State Game Lands Number 105, also located in Armstrong County
 Pennsylvania State Game Lands Number 137, also located in Armstrong County
 Pennsylvania State Game Lands Number 247, also located in Armstrong County
 Pennsylvania State Game Lands Number 259, also located in Armstrong County

References

287
Protected areas of Armstrong County, Pennsylvania